William Byaruhanga is a Ugandan lawyer and businessman. He served as  the Attorney General of Uganda in the Ugandan Cabinet. He was appointed to that position on 6 June 2016, replacing Fred Ruhindi, who was dropped from cabinet.

Background and education
William Byaruhanga graduated from Makerere University, with a Bachelor of Laws. He then attended the Law Development Centre, graduating with a Diploma in Legal Practice. He was admitted to the Uganda Bar in 1988.

Career
Prior to his current appointment, Byaruhanga was the Principal Partner of Kasirye, Byaruhanga and Company Advocates, a privately owned Kampala law firm. On 6 June 2016, he was appointed as Attorney General of Uganda.

Other responsibilities
William Byaruhanga serves on the board of directors of Centum Investments, since October 2016.

See also
 Cabinet of Uganda
 Parliament of Uganda

References

Living people
20th-century Ugandan lawyers
Members of the Parliament of Uganda
People from Kabarole District
People from Western Region, Uganda
Makerere University alumni
Law Development Centre alumni
Attorneys General of Uganda
Year of birth missing (living people)
21st-century Ugandan politicians
21st-century Ugandan lawyers